The Nedumala Caves are in Piralimattam. They are located on the border of Idukki district and Ernakulam District in Kerala state, India. Piralimattom Nedumala hills is a prehistoric site. Caves well carved on granite rock and stone shelter are here. According to P. Rajendran, an archaeologist and UGC Research Scientist, caves are  points towards its chronology to the Neolithic period of around 4000 BC.

The three caves discovered at Piralimattam in Nedumala have elaborate petroglyphs in cupules and shallow grinding surface. At Piralimattam there are many concave cupules and grinding surfaces, both completed and in-completed. Even at the floor levels sight, excavations in future may unravel early Stone Age evidences from the thick deposit within the caves.

Prehistoric rock-shelter 

It is a man made shelter of the Prehistoric past having a large single rock slab of 4 meter length, 2 m width and 1.5 feet thickness which rests on two rock out-crops of 5 feet height. Shelter is in north-south direction and its opening is on the eastern side. Shelter has 5 feet height and can accommodate two or three people inside. Placing and carrying of such a heavy rock slab requires number of healthy human being and teamwork. The shelter seen at Paralimattam in Nedumala of Ernakulam district has no characteristics of a Dolmen or Muniyara of the Megalithic culture but is definitely a man made shelter in the past, possibly yet another type.

Location 
Piralimattam nedumala is in Manjalloor panchayath of Ernakulam district, Kerala. It is 3 km from Kadalikkadu and 5 km from Vazhakulam. Travellers have to negotiate a difficult terrain, cover a two-kilometre-stretch on the Kavana Pulukkayath kadavu via Kadalikkadu and scale small hills on the way.

References

Caves of Kerala
Archaeological sites in Kerala